I Am is the second album from American singer Elisa Fiorillo, released by Chrysalis in 1990.

I Am was not a commercial success when released in 1990. Its two singles were more successful, particularly the lead single "On the Way Up" which reached number 27 on the US Billboard Hot 100. The second single "Oooh This I Need" was released in 1991 and reached number 90 in the chart.

Background
Elisa Fiorillo recorded I Am at Prince's Paisley Park recording studio, with David Z producing the majority of the album. Fiorillo originally approached David Z and expressed her interest in recording at Paisley Park. She recalled in 1991, "I wanted to take the Philadelphia soul sound and add it to the Minneapolis funk and make myself a really soulful little white girl." Speaking of the end result, she stated in another interview, "I went in with a different attitude and I came out with what I wanted. They [the record company] didn't want me to sing R&B because they didn't have a department for that kind of music. I said, 'I don't care, that's what I want, that's what I sing. I'm going to make the record anyway - you guys are gonna have to get an R&B department'."

Prince contributed to I Am by writing three of the songs songs, co-writing a further two and producing one track. In an interview at the time, Fiorillo revealed of her collaboration with Prince on I Am, "I was at Paisley Park Studios working on my second album. I had just finished some vocals. I went to the bathroom, came back, and Prince was sitting there in the studio listening to my tape. He looked up and said, 'You're a good singer. Why don't you go in there and sing for me?' I was always taught to be confident. So I went in and started singing. I didn't know it at the time, but [he] had been writing a song called 'I Am' for me. And he was always on my case, urging me to write more. He said, 'Tomorrow I want you to bring in a new set of lyrics and we'll write a song.' I stayed up until 4am writing. He was extremely nice, and completely respectful."

Song information
"Ain't Right" is about interracial relationships. Fiorillo revealed, "I got the idea from a friend of mine who was going out with a black guy. 'Ain't Right' is about the way her parents reacted. If a person loves somebody you shouldn't put any boundaries on it. I mean, I'm Italian; I don't want people saying 'Don't go out with her, she eats too much pasta'." "Purpose in Your Life", an anti-teenage suicide song, was inspired by a letter Fiorillo received several years before from a despondent 13-year-old fan. Fiorillo stated. "I wrote her a letter back, and I told her you have to have a purpose and you should realize that you can't live for everyone else - you have to live for yourself. She wrote me back, and so did her parents, thanking me. It made me think I can really help people and it's nobody's doing but mine." "Love's No Fun" was later covered by Mayte Garcia on her 1995 album Child of the Sun.

Track listing

Personnel 
 Elisa Fiorillo - vocals, writer (track 2, 7, 8, 9, 10)
 David Z. - producer (tracks 1-5 and 8-10), drums (track 1, 3), percussion (tracks 1, 2, 3, 5, 10), writer (track 1, 2, 10), recorded by (track 5), all instruments (track 8)
 Levi Seacer Jr. - all instruments (track 1, 2, 8, 10), writer (track 1, 2, 10), co-producer (track 2, 8, 10), drums (track 3), percussion (track 3), other instruments (track 3), bass (track 6), guitar (track 9)
 Prince - writer (track 1, 2, 4, 5, 6), other instruments (track 5), producer (track 6)
 Bill Kenner - writer (track 3)
 Michael Smotherman - writer (track 3)
 Tom Flora - writer (track 3)
 Cynthia Johnson - backing vocals (track 4)
 Ingrid Chavez - backing vocals (track 4)
 Jana Anderson - backing vocals (track 4)
 Rosie Gaines - backing vocals (track 4, 6)
 Michael Koppelman - recorded by (track 4, 5, 6), harpsichord (track 6)
 Junior Vasquez - remix (track 4)
 The Steeles - backing vocals (track 5, 7)
 Sonny Thompson - bass (track 5)
 Michael Bland - drums (track 5)
 Michael Bland - acoustic drums (track 6)
 Kirk Johnson - electric drums (track 6)
 The Wild Pair - backing vocals (track 7)
 St. Paul - electric bass (track 7), organ (track 7)
 Oliver Leiber - drums (track 7), producer (track 7), writer (track 7)
 Keith Cohen - mixer (track 7)
 Ian Prince - co-producer (track 8), all instruments (track 8), writer (track 8)
 Darryl Duncan - co-producer (track 9), all instruments (track 9), writer (track 9)

Charts

Singles

On the Way Up

Oooh This I Need

References

1990 albums
Elisa Fiorillo albums
Albums produced by Prince (musician)
Chrysalis Records albums